Mirko Petrović-Njegoš (19 August 1820 – 1 August 1867) was a Montenegrin military commander, politician and poet, belonging to the House of Petrović-Njegoš. He was given the title of veliki vojvoda (Grand Duke) of Grahovo, and is thus also known as Vojvoda Mirko (Duke Mirko). He was the father of Nikola, the future ruler of Montenegro.

Life
Mirko was born on 19 August 1820, in Njeguši, the son of Stanko Petrović-Njegoš and wife Krstinja Vrbica. He was the older brother of Prince Danilo I, while his uncle was Petar II Petrović-Njegoš. He is famous for winning the Battle of Grahovac on 1 May 1858, leading the Montenegrin army against the Ottomans.

In 1862, after the Convention of Scutari, he was deported because he had fought against the Ottomans.

His epic corpus Junački spomenik (Heroic Monument), published in the Montenegrin capital of Cetinje in 1864, glorifies Montenegro and Montenegrins, and tells of the great victories over the Ottoman Empire.

They had three children: 
 Nikola ( – March 1, 1921)
 Princess Anastasia (d. March 29, 1879), married to Savo Plamenac
 Princess Maria, married to Capt. Y. Gopcević.

In February 1857, vojvoda Mirko Petrović-Njegoš replaced his cousin Đorđije Petrović-Njegoš as the President of the Governing Senate of Montenegro and the Highlands, he served during the reign of his brother prince Danilo I and later during the reign of his son prince Nicholas. He held the position of president until his death in August 1867.

Work 
His writings include this book of poetry owned by the Library of Congress in Washington, DC:
 Junački spomenik (1951; 185 pages) LCCN: 55037918 Call number: PG1418.P53 J8

See also 
 Battle of Grahovac

References

External links

 Junački spomenik
 
"Ko je bio vojvoda Mirko: Veliki ratni pobjednik i spasilac moštiju sv. Vasilija Ostroškog" (text in montenegrin language)

1820 births
1867 deaths
People of the Principality of Montenegro
Montenegrin soldiers
Montenegrin poets
Montenegrin male writers
Montenegrin composers
Military personnel from Cetinje
Petrović-Njegoš dynasty
19th-century poets
Prime Ministers of Montenegro
Speakers of the Parliament of Montenegro
Politicians from Cetinje
Writers from Cetinje